Samsung Galaxy J5 2016 is an Android-based smartphone produced, developed, released and marketed by Samsung Electronics. It was unveiled and released in April 2016. It has 2 GB LPDDR3 RAM.

The Galaxy J5 has a 13 Megapixel rear camera with LED flash, f/1.9 aperture, auto-focus and a 5,2 Megapixel front facing camera f/1.9, also equipped with LED flash.

Specifications

Hardware
The phone is powered by Qualcomm's Snapdragon 410 chipset, a 1.2 GHz processor, Adreno 306 GPU and 2 GB RAM with 16 GB of internal storage and a 3100 mAh battery. The Samsung Galaxy J5 (2016) is fitted with a 5.2-inch HD Super AMOLED display.

Software
This phone comes with Android 6.0.1, upgradeable to Android 7.1.1. It supports 4G LTE with dual SIM enabled 4G. It also supports Samsung Knox.

See also

 Samsung Galaxy J
 Samsung Galaxy
 Samsung
 Android (operating system)

References

Galaxy Core
Galaxy Core
Samsung smartphones
Android (operating system) devices
Mobile phones introduced in 2016
Mobile phones with user-replaceable battery